Atcherley is a surname. Notable people with the surname include:

David Atcherley (1904–1952), British pilot
Frank Atcherley Rose (1873–1935), British surgeon
Harold Atcherley (1918–2017), British businessman
Mary Haʻaheo Atcherley (1874–1933), Hawaiian linguist and politician
Richard Atcherley (1904–1970), British pilot